Sugar Creek Township, Ohio may refer to:

Sugar Creek Township, Allen County, Ohio
Sugar Creek Township, Putnam County, Ohio
Sugar Creek Township, Stark County, Ohio
Sugar Creek Township, Tuscarawas County, Ohio
Sugar Creek Township, Wayne County, Ohio

Note, there is also a single word version of Sugar Creek:
Sugarcreek Township, Greene County, Ohio

Ohio township disambiguation pages